The Prykerchenske field is a Ukrainian oil field that was discovered in 2009 and located on the continental shelf of the Black Sea. It will begin production in 2015 and will produce oil and natural gas.

References

Black Sea energy
Oil fields in Ukraine
Chornomornaftogaz property